Cychrus semigranosus is a species of ground beetle in the subfamily of Carabinae. It was described by Palliardi in 1825.

References

semigranosus
Beetles described in 1825